GYL may refer to:
 Argyle Airport, in Western Australia
 Gayil language
 Gyldendal Norsk Forlag, a Norwegian publisher, stock symbol